Locklear is a surname. It may refer to:

 Arlinda Locklear (b. 1951), Native American lawyer
 Ashton Locklear (b. 1998), American gymnast
 Gene Locklear, Native American baseball player
 Heather Locklear (b. 1961), American actress
 Ormer Locklear (1891–1920), American stunt pilot and film actor
 Samuel J. Locklear (b. 1954), American navy admiral